Declaration of Independence is a 1938 American short drama film directed by Crane Wilbur. It won an Academy Award at the 11th Academy Awards in 1939 for Best Short Subject (Two-Reel), and has been credited as being one of the few films relating to the American Revolution to win this award.

Declaration of Independence was part of Warner Bros.'s Old Glory series, which consisted of several short films that covered American history.

Cast
 John Litel as Thomas Jefferson
 Ted Osborne as Caesar Rodney
 Rosella Towne as Betsy Kramer
 Richard Bond as Thomas Lynch Jr.
 Owen King as Edward Rutledge
 Henry Hall as John Hancock
 Walter Walker as Benjamin Franklin
 Ferris Taylor as John Adams

References

External links
 
 
 

1938 films
1938 drama films
1938 short films
American drama films
American black-and-white films
Films directed by Crane Wilbur
Live Action Short Film Academy Award winners
Vitaphone short films
Warner Bros. short films
1930s English-language films
1930s American films